Roripaugh is a surname. Notable people with the surname include:

Lee Ann Roripaugh (born 1965), American poet
Robert Roripaugh (1930–2019), American poet